James Bartlett Hammond (April 23, 1839 – January 27, 1913) was an American journalist, inventor, entrepreneur, and philanthropist.

Biography
Born in South Boston, Hammond was a student at Boston Latin School and Phillips Academy in Andover, Massachusetts. He graduated from the University of Vermont in 1861.  During the American Civil War, he was a war correspondent for the New York Tribune. During and after the war, he attended Union Theological Seminary, graduating in 1865. He studied at the University of Halle from 1865 to 1866.

The Hammond Typewriter won for its inventor the Elliott Cresson Medal in 1890.

Hammond married Jeannette Maxwell on September 15, 1897 in Boston. He died in 1913 aboard his yacht near St. Augustine, Florida. He was estranged from his wife at the time of his death, and his will left his patents to Manhattan's Metropolitan Museum of Art.

References

External links
 

1839 births
1913 deaths
University of Vermont alumni
Union Theological Seminary (New York City) alumni
American inventors
19th-century American philanthropists